3 Strikes is a 2000 American comedy film written and directed by DJ Pooh, and starring Brian Hooks, N'Bushe Wright, Faizon Love and David Alan Grier. Despite some commercial success, it was negatively received by critics. The title refers to California's habitual offender law, whereby three convictions confer an automatic life sentence.

Plot
Rob Douglas has just been released from jail for the second time. Fearing a third conviction, which will result in a life sentence, he decides to go straight and leave the street life. His friend J.J. picks him up. However, the police show up and he learns that J.J. was driving a stolen car. When his friend J.J. is wounded from a shot to the buttocks and is taken into custody, Douglas learns he has been implicated in the shooting. He reaches out to his probation officer for help in proving his innocence, but is told that his best option is to simply turn himself in. J.J. is planning to have Douglas take the fall for the crime.

Douglas' mother informs him that a woman named Dahlia has information that will prove his innocence. Dahlia, who has been infatuated with Douglas ever since they were in high school, agrees to cooperate if he will have sex with her. Robert accepts her proposal. The police finds out that J.J. was behind the theft and also learn that J.J. was going to frame Douglas for it. As Douglas sneaks out of Dahlia's home, the police show up and send a dog after him. Douglas manages to get to his car and a high-speed chase ensues.

At his trial, the judge dismisses the felony charges. However, since Douglas failed to check in with his probation officer after leaving prison, he is sentenced to 30 days in jail for violating his parole. His family tells Douglas that they'll pick him up when he gets release this time. An epilogue states that Douglas was eventually released from prison early due to overcrowding.

Cast

Reception

Box office
The film opened at #12 at the North American box office making $3,684,704 USD in its opening weekend.

Critical response
The film received overwhelmingly negative reviews. On review aggregator website Rotten Tomatoes, with 29 reviews, the film has a rare approval rating of 0%meaning no favorable reviews whatsoeverreceiving an average rating of 2.31/10 and the consensus that it "lacks direction and its low-brow humor isn't even that funny". Metacritic rated it 11/100 based on 16 reviews, indicating "Overwhelming dislike".  Joe Leydon of Variety called it "exuberantly rude and crude, but generally more frantic than genuinely funny".

Soundtrack

A soundtrack containing hip hop music was released on February 22, 2000 by Priority Records. It peaked at the 190th position on the Billboard 200 and number 52 on the Top R&B/Hip-Hop Albums. The film's score was composed by Stewart Copeland.

References

External links
 
 
 
 
 

2000 films
2000s screwball comedy films
American crime comedy films
American independent films
American screwball comedy films
2000s English-language films
Films scored by Stewart Copeland
Films set in Los Angeles
Hood comedy films
Metro-Goldwyn-Mayer films
African-American comedy films
2000s crime comedy films
2000 directorial debut films
2000 comedy films
2000 independent films
2000s American films
English-language crime comedy films